Yevgeny Vitalyevich Balitsky (born 10 December 1969) is a Russian and Ukrainian politician and entrepreneur currently serving as the acting Governor of the Russian occupation of Zaporizhzhia Oblast from 4 October 2022. He also de jure serves as a deputy of the Zaporizhzhia Oblast Council. Previously was Head of Zaporizhzhia military–civilian administration from since 9 May 2022. Also, previously served as a People's Deputy of Ukraine in the 7th and 8th convocations of the Verkhovna Rada (Ukraine's parliament). 

Born in Melitopol to a military family, Balitsky served in the Soviet Air Forces and Ukrainian Air Force before entering business, serving as head of a household appliance company in Melitopol. He entered politics as an independent member of the Zaporizhzhia Oblast Council before joining the Party of Regions in 2004. Balitsky served two terms as a People's Deputy of Ukraine, the first as a member of the Party of Regions and the second as a member of the Opposition Bloc.

Following the 2022 Russian invasion of Ukraine, Balitsky began to collaborate with Russian authorities. Originally suspected to be de facto mayor of Melitopol by the Security Service of Ukraine, he was later appointed as Governor of Zaporizhzhia Oblast by Russian authorities on 9 May 2022, amidst the occupation of the southern parts of the oblast by the Russian military.

Early life and career 
Yevhen Vitaliiovych Balitsky was born in Melitopol, then in the Ukrainian Soviet Socialist Republic of the Soviet Union, on 10 December 1969, to a family of military aviators. In 1987, he graduated from high school. In 1991, he graduated from Tambov Higher Military Aviation School as a lieutenant. For the next four years, he served in various aviation garrisons, and in 1995 was transferred to the reserves from Melitopol Regiment military transport aircraft with the rank of captain.

From 1995 to 1997, he was the head of the OlZheKa company, which sold and repaired household appliances in Melitopol. In 1996, OlZheKa established the first FM radio station in Melitopol, called Southern Space.

From 1997 to 2007, Balitsky was head of the Melitopol Brewery, and only in 2007 sold a controlling stake in this company. Since 2000, led Melitopol Avtogidroagregat, a tractor parts company. As of 2012, he was deputy director for economics at Melitopol Avtogidroagregat. Both Melitopol Brewery and Avtogidroagregat achieved economic success under Balitsky's leadership.

Regional politics 
From 1998 to 2002, Balitsky was a deputy of the Zaporizhzhia Oblast Council, as an independent.

In 2004, he joined the Party of Regions, and from 2010 to 2012 again served as a deputy of the Zaporizhzhia Oblast Council for this party. This time serving as a member of the Standing Committee on the Budget, as well as the Acting Director of the Department in the Ministry of Economy and European Integration.

National politics 

From 2012 to 2019, Balitsky was a People's Deputy of Ukraine, serving in the 7th and 8th convocation of the Verkhovna Rada (Ukraine's national parliament). He was elected both times as member of Zaporizhia Oblast district No. 80, a multi-member district comprising Melitopol and Melitopol Raion. In the 2012 Ukrainian parliamentary election he was elected as a member of the Party of Regions and in 2014 reelected as a self-nominated candidate.

On 14 February 2014, he was elected deputy chairman of the Melitopol organisation of the Party of Regions. In April, Balitsky noted environmental problems at Molochnyi Lyman.

On 3 June 2014, Balitsky left the Party of Regions faction in the Verkhovna Rada, later joining the Opposition Bloc in May 2015.

In the 2019 Ukrainian parliamentary election Balitsky failed to get reelected in district No. 80, this time for the party Opposition Bloc. In this election he gained 29.5% of the votes in the constituency, while winner Serhii Minko won with 33.13%.

In the 2020 Ukrainian local elections Balitsky was again elected as a deputy of the Zaporizhzhia Oblast Council for the party Opposition Bloc.

Collaboration with Russian forces 

Following the capture of Melitopol by Russian forces during the 2022 Russian invasion of Ukraine, Balitsky assisted in the establishment of a new, pro-Russian government in the city. The Security Service of Ukraine (SBU) has claimed that Balitsky is the grey eminence of the occupation in Melitopol.

On 9 May 2022, it was reported that Balitsky was appointed governor of the Russian-occupied Zaporizhia Oblast. Balitsky became a member of United Russia on 26 September 2022.

On 30 September 2022, Balitsky and the other pro-Russian occupation heads, Denis Pushilin, Leonid Pasechnik and Volodymyr Saldo, attended the ceremony in Moscow during which Vladimir Putin formally announced the annexation of the Donetsk, Kherson, Luhansk and Zaporizhzhia oblasts.

In January 2023, Balitisky and the administration established the Pavel Sudoplatov Battalion and Balitsky's son joined it as a soldier.

Awards 
 2013 – Order of Merit, Third degree

Notes

References 

21st-century Ukrainian politicians
1969 births
People from Melitopol
Living people
Russian nationalists
Seventh convocation members of the Verkhovna Rada
Eighth convocation members of the Verkhovna Rada
Party of Regions politicians
Opposition Bloc politicians
Recipients of the Order of Merit (Ukraine), 3rd class
Ukrainian collaborators with Russia during the 2022 Russian invasion of Ukraine
United Russia politicians
Pro-Russian people of the war in Donbas
Anti-Ukrainian sentiment in Ukraine